Pedro Alvarado may refer to:

 Pedro Alvarado (miner), Mexican mining magnate and philanthropist
 Pedro de Alvarado (c. 1485–1541), Spanish conquistador and governor of Guatemala